Tirandaj Shabor is a 2022 Indian Bengali-language crime thriller film directed by Arindam Sil based on Shirshendu Mukhopadhyay’s novel Tirandaj. It is the sequel to 2018 film Aschhe Abar Shabor and the fourth installment of Goenda Shabor film series. The film was released on 27 May 2022 under the banner of Camellia Productions.

Plot
A cab driver Sumit Ghoshal rushed into a police station with a passenger who is seriously ill. Immediately after this, the investigating officer finds him dead. Police suspect Sumit for the incident. ACP Shabor Dasgupta and his assistant Nanda starts investigation and discovers that there are number of mysterious characters close to the victim Sitanath Samaddar. Samaddar has a dark past and there are many suspects who can take revenge.

Cast
 Saswata Chatterjee as Shabor Dasgupta
 Subhrajit Dutta as Nanda
 Nigel Akkara as Sumit Ghoshal/ Bulu Da
 Arindam Sil as Sitanath Samaddar
 Chandan Sen as Pareshnath Chakraborty
 Poulomi Das as Sonali Basu
 Saranya Kar as Jamuna
 Debjani Chatterjee as Papia Samaddar
 Devlina Kumar as Pritha/Rumki

Soundtrack

Reception

References

External links 
 

2022 crime drama films
2020s Bengali-language films
Bengali-language Indian films
Films based on works by Shirshendu Mukhopadhyay
Films directed by Arindam Sil
Films scored by Bickram Ghosh
Indian crime drama films
Indian detective films